Errol McLean (3 June 1952) is a Guyanese former cyclist. He competed in the 1000m time trial event at the 1980 Summer Olympics.

References

External links
 

1952 births
Living people
Guyanese male cyclists
Commonwealth Games competitors for Guyana
Cyclists at the 1978 Commonwealth Games
Olympic cyclists of Guyana
Cyclists at the 1980 Summer Olympics
Place of birth missing (living people)